Mark Gerretsen  (born June 5, 1975) is a Canadian politician who is the Member of Parliament for Kingston and the Islands as a member of the Liberal Party of Canada. He was first elected in the 2015 federal election, and re-elected in 2019 and 2021. He currently serves on the Standing Committee for Procedure and House Affairs and is the former Chair of the Ontario Liberal Caucus.

Since 2021, Gerretsen has served as the Parliamentary secretary to the Leader of the Government in the House of Commons. Prior to his election to the House of Commons, Gerretsen served as Mayor of Kingston from 2010 to 2014.

Biography 
Born in Kingston, Ontario, Gerretsen holds a bachelor's degree in economics from Queen's University and studied Computer Engineering at St. Lawrence College. Gerretsen was first elected to Kingston City Council in 2006, where he represented the Portsmouth District. After completing his four-year term as City Councillor, Mark served as Mayor of Kingston from 2010 to 2014.

Municipal politics 
As Mayor, Gerretsen worked alongside the City of Kingston and municipal leaders across Ontario, advancing issues such as payments in lieu of taxes, the integration of social services, and increased investment in local infrastructure and affordable housing. Gerretsen also oversaw the creation of the Mayor's Task Force on Development to improve customer service for residents, and the development of an Age-Friendly Plan focused on making Kingston more senior-friendly.

In 2012, Gerretsen was elected to represent the City of Kingston on the Association of Municipalities of Ontario (AMO) Board of Directors. As a member of the Large Urban Mayor's Caucus of Ontario (LUMCO), Gerretsen worked with municipal leaders across Ontario advocating for increased investments in local infrastructure and affordable housing.

Gerretsen gained some notoriety in 2013 when he voiced his displeasure regarding the street partying that occurs during Queen's University's Homecoming. The event had taken a five-year hiatus due to rowdy behaviour and significant costs to the municipality for policing and clean up, and Gerretsen had reservations about the event's return. Gerretsen visited Aberdeen Street that weekend to assess the situation. He tweeted directly to Queen's Principal Daniel Woolf: “I am standing at William and Aberdeen. I have two words for you: NOT GOOD”. The “NOT GOOD” phrase was, in turn, used by Queen's University students and publicized in a number of memes at the Mayor's expense.

Federal politics 
Gerretsen was first elected as a Member of Parliament in the 2015 federal election, replacing first-term Liberal MP Ted Hsu, who chose not to seek re-election. Gerretsen defeated Conservative candidate Andy Brooke by over 21,000 votes and earned 55.37% of the ballots cast.

In his first term in federal office, Gerretsen served on the Standing Committee for National Defense, and was elected as Chair of the Ontario Liberal Caucus. Gerretsen was also a member of the Standing Committee on the Environment and Sustainable Development for two and a half years.

Throughout 2015–2019, Gerretsen was able to obtain federal funding for many initiatives in Kingston and the Islands. Some of these investments included $1 million for Breakwater Park and Gord Downie Pier, $42 million for public transit, $31 million for new ferry vessels and $60 million for the Third Crossing.

Gerretsen's Private Members Bill, Bill C-243, The National Maternity Assistance Program Strategy, aimed to introduce amendments to the Employment Insurance Act to create a national maternity assistance program for women who are unable to work during their pregnancy and was based on the first-hand experience of a constituent in his riding. Gerretsen's Private Members Bill was introduced to the House of Commons on February 26, 2016. After passing second and third reading in Parliament, on October 26 and June 14, 2017, respectively, Gerretsen's Private Members Bill was brought to the Senate for first reading on June 14, 2017. When Parliament dissolved in the summer of 2019, Bill C-243 was at the Senate for third reading.

Gerretsen supports many Liberal policies, but sometimes voices his concerns with the direction the government takes on various files. As a strong environmental proponent, Gerretsen openly spoke against the Government's decision to expand the Kinder Morgan pipeline. In June 2018, Mark was one of three Liberal MPs who voted in favour of a motion proposed by the New Democratic Party to stop the project.

In 2019, Mark was re-elected as Member of Parliament. Currently, Gerretsen is a member of the Standing Committee on Procedure and House Affairs and continues to be the Chair of the Ontario Liberal Caucus.

Personal life 
Gerretsen and his wife Vanessa live in Kingston's east end with their three children Mason, Francesco and Vivian. Mark is the son of John Gerretsen, former Mayor of Kingston and MPP for Kingston and the Islands who held several positions in the cabinets of Premier Dalton McGuinty and Kathleen Wynne.

Environment 
While Mayor of Kingston, Mark oversaw the launch of Sustainable Kingston, an organization launched by the city as a non-profit to support Kingston in achieving the vision of becoming Canada's most sustainable city. Gerretsen was also Mayor of Kingston when the City converted all street lights to LED.

Personally, Gerretsen was an early participant in the province of Ontario's Microfit program aimed at encouraging homeowners to install solar panels to feed electricity back into the grid. Gerretsen and his wife, Vanessa, have been driving electric vehicles since 2012.

Electoral record

Federal

Municipal

References

External links
 Mark Gerretsen

Mayors of Kingston, Ontario
1975 births
Living people
Queen's University at Kingston alumni
Liberal Party of Canada MPs
Members of the House of Commons of Canada from Ontario
Canadian people of Dutch descent
21st-century Canadian politicians